The following outline is provided as an overview of and topical guide to South America.

South America is the southern continent of the two Americas, situated entirely in the Western Hemisphere and mostly (about 3/4) in the Southern Hemisphere. It lies between the Pacific and Atlantic oceans. The continent is culturally, ethnically and racially diverse, home to indigenous peoples and to descendants of settlers from Europe, Africa and Asia. Due to its history of colonialism most South Americans speak Spanish or Portuguese, and its societies and states are commonly modeled after Western traditions.

Geography of South America 
Geography of South America

Geography by political division

Geography of countries 

 Geography of Argentina
 Geography of Bolivia
 Geography of Brazil
 Geography of Chile
 Geography of Colombia
 Geography of Ecuador
 Geography of Guyana
 Geography of Panama
 Geography of Paraguay
 Geography of Peru
 Geography of Suriname
 Geography of Trinidad and Tobago
 Geography of Uruguay
 Geography of Venezuela

Geography of dependencies and other territories 

 Geography of Aruba
 Geography of Bonaire
 Geography of Curaçao
 Geography of the Falkland Islands
 Geography of French Guiana
 Geography of South Georgia and the South Sandwich Islands

Geographical features of South America 
 List of islands of South America
 List of rivers of South America
 List of World Heritage Sites in South America

Regions of South America

Directional regions 

 Eastern South America: Federative Republic of Brazil
 Northern South America (the part of South America located in the Northern Hemisphere)
 North-eastern South America: The Guianas
 North-western South America: Caribbean South America
 Southern South America: Southern Cone
 Western South America: Andean States

Natural regions 

 Altiplano
 Amazon basin
 Amazon rainforest
 Brazilian Amazon
 Peruvian Amazon
  Andes
 Tropical Andes
 Dry Andes
 Wet Andes
 Atacama Desert
 Brazilian Highlands
 Caribbean South America
 Gran Chaco
 Guianas
 Llanos
 Pampas
 Pantanal
 Patagonia
 Tierra del Fuego
 Atlantic Forest
 Caatinga
 Cerrado
 Chiquitano dry forests

Political divisions of South America

Countries of South America 

List of South American countries

 Argentina
 Bolivia
 Brazil
 Chile
 Colombia
 Ecuador
 Guyana
 Panama
 Paraguay
 Peru
 Suriname
 Trinidad and Tobago
 Uruguay
 Venezuela

Dependencies and other territories 

 Aruba
 Bonaire
 Curaçao
 Falkland Islands
 French Guiana
 South Georgia and the South Sandwich Islands

Regions by country 

 Regions of Argentina
 Regions of Bolivia
 Regions of Brazil
 Regions of Chile
 Regions of Colombia
 Regions of Ecuador
 Regions of Guyana
 Regions of Paraguay
 Regions of Peru
 Regions of Suriname
 Regions of Trinidad and Tobago
 Regions of Uruguay
 Regions of Venezuela

Demography of South America 

Demographics of South America
List of South American countries by population
List of South American countries by GDP PPP

Demographics by political division

Demographics of countries 

 Demographics of Argentina
 Demographics of Bolivia
 Demographics of Brazil
 Demographics of Chile
 Demographics of Colombia
 Demographics of Ecuador
 Demographics of Guyana
 Demographics of Panama
 Demographics of Paraguay
 Demographics of Peru
 Demographics of Suriname
 Demographics of Trinidad and Tobago
 Demographics of Uruguay
 Demographics of Venezuela

Demographics of dependencies and other territories 

 Demographics of Aruba
 Demographics of Bonaire
 Demographics of Curaçao
 Demographics of the Falkland Islands
 Demographics of French Guiana
 Demographics of South Georgia and the South Sandwich Islands

Politics of South America 
 Conflicts in South America
 Political parties in South America

Politics by political division

Politics of countries 

 Politics of Argentina
 Politics of Bolivia
 Politics of Brazil
 Politics of Chile
 Politics of Colombia
 Politics of Ecuador
 Politics of Guyana
 Politics of Panama
 Politics of Paraguay
 Politics of Peru
 Politics of Suriname
 Politics of Trinidad and Tobago
 Politics of Uruguay
 Politics of Venezuela

Politics of dependencies and other territories 

 Politics of Aruba
 Politics of Bonaire
 Politics of Curaçao
 Politics of the Falkland Islands
 Politics of French Guiana
 Politics of South Georgia and the South Sandwich Islands

Elections by political division

Elections in countries 

 Elections in Argentina
 Elections in Bolivia
 Elections in Brazil
 Elections in Chile
 Elections in Colombia
 Elections in Ecuador
 Elections in Guyana
 Elections in Panama
 Elections in Paraguay
 Elections in Peru
 Elections in Suriname
 Elections in Trinidad and Tobago
 Elections in Uruguay
 Elections in Venezuela

Elections in dependencies and other territories 

 Elections in Aruba
 Elections in Bonaire
 Elections in Curaçao
 Elections in the Falkland Islands
 Elections in French Guiana
 Elections in South Georgia and the South Sandwich Islands

Human rights by political division

Human rights in countries 

 Human rights in Argentina
 Human rights in Bolivia
 Human rights in Brazil
 Human rights in Chile
 Human rights in Colombia
 Human rights in Ecuador
 Human rights in Guyana
 Human rights in Panama
 Human rights in Paraguay
 Human rights in Peru
 Human rights in Suriname
 Human rights in Trinidad and Tobago
 Human rights in Uruguay
 Human rights in Venezuela

Human rights in dependencies and other territories 

 Human rights in Aruba
 Human rights in Bonaire
 Human rights in Curaçao
 Human rights in the Falkland Islands
 Human rights in French Guiana
 Human rights in South Georgia and the South Sandwich Islands

Law by political division

Law of countries 

 Law of Argentina
 Law of Bolivia
 Law of Brazil
 Law of Chile
 Law of Colombia
 Law of Ecuador
 Law of Guyana
 Law of Panama
 Law of Paraguay
 Law of Peru
 Law of Suriname
 Law of Trinidad and Tobago
 Law of Uruguay
 Law of Venezuela

Law of dependencies and other territories 

 Law of Aruba
 Law of Bonaire
 Law of Curaçao
 Law of the Falkland Islands
 Law of French Guiana
 Law of South Georgia and the South Sandwich Islands

Law enforcement by political division

Law enforcement in countries 

 Law enforcement in Argentina
 Law enforcement in Bolivia
 Law enforcement in Brazil
 Law enforcement in Chile
 Law enforcement in Colombia
 Law enforcement in Ecuador
 Law enforcement in Guyana
 Law enforcement in Panama
 Law enforcement in Paraguay
 Law enforcement in Peru
 Law enforcement in Suriname
 Law enforcement in Trinidad and Tobago
 Law enforcement in Uruguay
 Law enforcement in Venezuela

Law enforcement in dependencies and other territories 

 Law enforcement in Aruba
 Law enforcement in Bonaire
 Law enforcement in Curaçao
 Law enforcement in the Falkland Islands
 Law enforcement in French Guiana
 Law enforcement in South Georgia and the South Sandwich Islands

Governments of South America 
 South American Union

History of South America

History of South America, by period 
 Pre-Columbian era
 Early modern period
 European colonization of the Americas
 Portuguese colonization of the Americas
 Colonial Brazil
 Spanish colonization of the Americas
 Colonial Argentina
 Colonial Bolivia
 Colonial Chile
 Colonial Peru
 Colonial Venezuela

History of South America, by region 
 History of Andean South America

History of South America, by country 

 History of Argentina
 History of Bolivia
 History of Brazil
 Empire of Brazil
 History of Chile
 History of Colombia
 History of Ecuador
 History of Guyana
 History of Panama
 History of Paraguay
 History of Peru
 History of Suriname
 History of Trinidad and Tobago
 History of Uruguay
 History of Venezuela

History of dependencies and other territories 

 History of Aruba
 History of Bonaire
 History of Curaçao
 History of the Falkland Islands
 History of French Guiana
 History of South Georgia and the South Sandwich Islands

History of South America, by subject 
 Military history of South America
 Spanish American wars of independence
 Latin American wars of independence
 South American dreadnought race
 Slavery in South America
 Slavery in Brazil

Culture of South America 

Culture of South America
Coats of arms of South America
Flags of South America
 Religion in South America
 Islam in South America
 Christianity in South America
 Hinduism in South America
 World Heritage Sites

Culture in South America, by country

Culture of countries 

 Culture of Argentina
 Culture of Bolivia
 Culture of Brazil
 Culture of Chile
 Culture of Colombia
 Culture of Ecuador
 Culture of Guyana
 Culture of Panama
 Culture of Paraguay
 Culture of Peru
 Culture of Suriname
 Culture of Trinidad and Tobago
 Culture of Uruguay
 Culture of Venezuela

Culture of dependencies and other territories 

 Culture of Aruba
 Culture of Bonaire
 Culture of Curaçao
 Culture of the Falkland Islands
 Culture of French Guiana
 Culture of South Georgia and the South Sandwich Islands

Architecture of South America 
 Architecture of Argentina
 Architecture of Colombia
 Architecture of Peru

The Arts in South America

Cuisine of South America 

Cuisine of South America

 Cuisine of Argentina
 Cuisine of Bolivia
 Cuisine of Brazil
 Cuisine of Chile
 Cuisine of Colombia
 Cuisine of Ecuador
 Cuisine of Guyana
 Cuisine of Panama
 Cuisine of Paraguay
 Cuisine of Peru
 Cuisine of Suriname
 Cuisine of Trinidad and Tobago
 Cuisine of Uruguay
 Cuisine of Venezuela

Languages of South America 

Languages of South America

Languages of South America, by country 

 Languages of Argentina
 Languages of Bolivia
 Languages of Brazil
 Languages of Chile
 Languages of Colombia
 Languages of Ecuador
 Languages of Guyana
 Languages of Panama
 Languages of Paraguay
 Languages of Peru
 Languages of Suriname
 Languages of Trinidad and Tobago
 Languages of Uruguay
 Languages of Venezuela

Languages of dependencies and other territories 

 Languages of Aruba
 Languages of Bonaire
 Languages of Curaçao
 Languages of the Falkland Islands
 Languages of French Guiana
 Languages of South Georgia and the South Sandwich Islands

Media of South America 
 Media of Argentina
 Media of Bolivia
 Media of Colombia
 Media of Paraguay
 Media of Peru
 Media of Venezuela

Prostistution in South America 

Prostitution in South America

 Prostitution in Argentina
 Prostitution in Bolivia
 Prostitution in Brazil
 Prostitution in Chile
 Prostitution in Colombia
 Prostitution in Ecuador
 Prostitution in Guyana
 Prostitution in Paraguay
 Prostitution in Peru
 Prostitution in Suriname
 Prostitution in Trinidad and Tobago
 Prostitution in Uruguay
 Prostitution in Venezuela

Racism in South America 

Racism in South America
 Racism in Argentina
 Racism in Brazil

Religion in South America 

Religion in South America

 Religion in Argentina
 Religion in Bolivia
 Religion in Brazil
 Religion in Chile
 Religion in Colombia
 Religion in Ecuador
 Religion in Guyana
 Religion in Panama
 Religion in Paraguay
 Religion in Peru
 Religion in Suriname
 Religion in Trinidad and Tobago
 Religion in Uruguay
 Religion in Venezuela

Sport in South America 

Sport in South America

Sport in South America, by country 

 Sport in Argentina
 Sport in Bolivia
 Sport in Brazil
 Sport in Chile
 Sport in Colombia
 Sport in Ecuador
 Sport in Guyana
 Sport in Panama
 Sport in Paraguay
 Sport in Peru
 Sport in Suriname
 Sport in Trinidad and Tobago
 Sport in Uruguay
 Sport in Venezuela

Sport in dependencies and other territories 

 Sport in Aruba
 Sport in Bonaire
 Sport in Curaçao
 Sport in the Falkland Islands
 Sport in French Guiana
 Sport in South Georgia and the South Sandwich Islands

Economy and infrastructure of South America

Education in South America

South America lists 

 List of newspapers in South America
 List of radio stations in South America
 List of television stations in South America

See also

Outline of North America
List of Caribbean-related topics
List of Central America-related topics
Lists of country-related topics
Index of Argentina-related articles
List of Bolivia-related topics
List of Chile-related topics
List of Falkland Islands-related topics
Index of French Guiana-related articles

External links

News
 Infolatam. Information and analysis of Latin America
 The Council on Hemispheric Affairs An independent source of Latin American news and opinion

Sports
 CONMEBOL -- Confederación Sudamericana de Fútbol (The South American Football Confederation)
South America also has Rugby, Auto Racing, Golf, and Kayaking.

Music
 Information about South American Music. Also MP3 & video.
Diana Mercado from Barranquilla, Colombia Objetivo Fama 5

Tourism

Articles
 "The failure of Latin America": an article by David Gallagher in the TLS, February 29, 2008

South America
South America
 1